Elbasan Arena (formerly known as Ruzhdi Bizhuta) is a  multi-purpose stadium in Elbasan, Albania. The stadium was completed in 1967 and has been the home ground of KF Elbasani ever since. The stadium was under reconstruction and was officially inaugurated on 8 October 2014 in time for the match against Denmark, valid for the qualifiers of UEFA Euro 2016, with total capacity of 12,800, making it the 3rd largest in Albania, after the Air Albania Stadium in Tirana.

History
Elbasan Arena first opened in 1967 under the name of Ruzhdi Bizhuta Stadion who was one of KF Elbasani’s most famous players. Constructed in the 1960s, the ground was built to replace the club’s former ground which had slowly become a set of outdated facilities.

For the majority of Ruzhdi Bizhuta’s history, the stadium has been used exclusively by KF Elbasani but in January 2014 it was announced that the ground would host Albania’s qualification matches of Euro 2016. This decision was taken by the Albanian Football Federation in order to allow the usual national stadium Qemal Stafa to undergo extensive renovation work.

2014 Reconstruction
Before Elbasan Arena could host the matches however it would have to undergo refurbishment itself,  and in total over €5.5 million invested into the stadium. Work to bring up the stadium to UEFA’s required standards began in February 2014, and finished 7 months later in October.

Numerous improvements were made to the stadium including the installation of new floodlights, 12,500 new plastic seats, new changing rooms, executive seating areas, new scoreboards, and to top it all of a brand new playing surface was laid.

The stadium then reopened on 8 October when Albania hosted Denmark in their second qualification match of the campaign. Played out in front of a sell-out crowd of 12,800 – the record attendance to date, Albania earned a 1-1 draw against their more favoured opposition.

Inauguration
The opening ceremony of the stadium was held on 11 October 2014, with a historical exhibition match against Denmark. Playing for the first time at the recently refurbished Elbasan Arena, the hosts grabbed a 38th-minute lead through Ermir Lenjani's deflected strike but Denmark substitute Lasse Vibe slotted home an 81st-minute equaliser as the Group I rivals went joint-top.

References

KF Elbasani
Football venues in Albania
Buildings and structures in Elbasan
Sport in Elbasan
Sports venues completed in 1967